In 2019, the  participated in the 2019 Super Rugby competition, the 24th edition of the competition since its inception in 1996.

The Sharks won seven, drew one and lost eight of their matches during the regular season of the competition to finish third in the South African Conference, and in 6th place overall to qualify for the finals as a wildcard team.

Personnel

Coaches and management

The Sharks coaching and management staff for the 2019 Super Rugby season were:

Squad

The following players were named in the Sharks squad for the 2019 Super Rugby season:

Standings

The table below shows the Sharks' progression throughout the season. For each round, their cumulative points total is shown with the overall log position:

Matches

The Sharks played the following matches during the 2019 Super Rugby season:

Player statistics

The Super Rugby appearance record for players that represented the Sharks in 2019 is as follows:

(c) denotes the team captain. For each match, the player's squad number is shown. Starting players are numbered 1 to 15, while the replacements are numbered 16 to 23. "App" refers to the number of appearances made by the player, "Try" to the number of tries scored by the player, "Con" to the number of conversions kicked, "Pen" to the number of penalties kicked, "DG" to the number of drop goals kicked and "Pts" refer to the total number of points scored by the player.

 Kwanda Dimaza, Muller du Plessis, Andrew Evans, Tera Mtembu, Sanele Nohamba, Chiliboy Ralepelle, Courtney Winnaar and Leolin Zas did not make any appearances.

See also

 Sharks
 2019 Super Rugby season

References

2019
2019 Super Rugby season by team
2019 in South African rugby union